Nadie oyó gritar a Cecilio Fuentes is a 1965 Argentine film.

Cast

External links
 

1965 films
1960s Spanish-language films
Argentine black-and-white films
1960s Argentine films